A Floating cable-stayed bridge is a type of cable-stayed bridge where the towers float on tension-leg submerged material, tethered to the seabed for buoyancy. No floating cable-stayed bridge has been made or planned yet, a floating suspension bridge has been planned in Norway.  This bridge could be more stable horizontally across the bridge than floating suspension bridges, the lateral movement force from the wind and current in the water is a problem trying to be resolved by placing the tethered cables at different angles from the floating platform to the seabed.

See also
List of longest cable-stayed bridge spans
List of longest suspension bridge spans
List of cable-stayed bridges in the United States
Cable-stayed suspension bridge

References

 
Bridges by structural type
Structural engineering